Ludovic Booz (16 June 1940 – 2 February 2015) was a Haitian painter and sculptor. Born in Aquin, Booz sculpted bronze busts of several Haitian presidents. His work has been exhibited in France, Israel, and Suriname.

References

 

1940 births
Haitian artists
Haitian painters
Haitian male painters
Haitian sculptors
2015 deaths